Walter David Clar Fritz (born 27 September 1994), is a Paraguayan professional footballer who plays as a right back for River Plate in the Primera División Uruguaya.

Professional career
Clar made his professional debut with Club Olimpia in a 2-1 Paraguayan Primera División loss to Club Sol de América on 28 July 2013. On 24 July 2019, Clar joined on loan Boavista with an option to buy.

References

External links
 
 
 ZeroZero Profile

1994 births
Living people
People from Itapúa Department
Paraguayan people of German descent
Paraguayan footballers
Paraguayan expatriate footballers
Olympic footballers of Paraguay
Boavista F.C. players
Club Sol de América footballers
Club Olimpia footballers
Club Rubio Ñu footballers
General Díaz footballers
Independiente F.B.C. footballers
Sportivo Luqueño players
Club Guaraní players
Paraguayan Primera División players
Association football fullbacks
Paraguayan expatriate sportspeople in Portugal
Expatriate footballers in Portugal
Club Atlético River Plate (Montevideo) players